Morgnies is a Charleroi Metro station, build at ground level and located in Goutroux (part of the Charleroi municipality), in fare zone 2. The station has only one entrance (on its western end), equipped with escalators and stairs.

Nearby points of interest 
The station is located between two sparsely populated residential areas, one in Goutroux, the other one in Monceau-sur-Sambre ("Hameau").

Transfers  
TEC Charleroi bus lines 50 and 51.

Charleroi Metro stations
Railway stations opened in 1983